Sydney Printmakers was an association of artists, founded in 1961, to further the art of print-making. It marked a renewal of interest in the technique after a lull of two decades occasioned by a boom in etching which began in the late 1930s.

Members included 
Earle Backen,
Sue Buckley,
John Coburn,
Joy Ewart,
Roy Fluke,
Strom Gould,
Weaver Hawkins,
Eva Kubbos,
Ursula Laverty,
Peter Laverty,
Vaclovas Ratas,
Elizabeth Rooney,
Henry Salkauskas,
James Sharp,
Algirdas Simkunas, and
David Strachan

References 

Australian artists
1962 establishments in Australia
Australian printmakers